Jeans is a 1998 Indian Tamil-language romantic comedy film written and directed by S. Shankar, and produced by Ashok Amritraj and Murali Manohar. The film stars Prashanth and Nassar in double roles each along with Aishwarya Rai, while Lakshmi, Raadhika Sarath Kumar, and Raju Sundaram play supporting roles. The film's background score and the soundtrack are composed by A. R. Rahman, while Ashok Kumar and the duo B. Lenin and V. T. Vijayan handled the cinematography and editing respectively.

The film opened on 24 April 1998 and was the most expensive film to be made in Indian cinema at that time. The film was selected by India as its official submission for the Best Foreign Language Film for the Academy Awards in 1998, but was not nominated.

Plot 
Nachiappan is a wealthy and successful Indian American restaurateur based in Los Angeles. He has two sons – Viswanathan "Visu" and Ramamoorthy "Ramu" – who are identical twins. They both are medical students and spend their evenings helping out their father alongside the restaurant's chief cook, Juno. One evening, when Visu & Ramu go to the airport to do their lunch supply, Visu sees an Indian Tamil family from Chennai – Madhumitha "Madhu", her younger brother Madhesh, and their grandmother Krishnaveny – having some problems with the immigration authorities. Visu pitches in to help and learns that they just flew in from India so that Krishnaveny can undergo a surgery to remove her brain tumour. After many confusions, the trio meets with Ramu also. The twins arrange for the three to reach their host.

Krishnaveny is admitted in the hospital where Visu works as a resident doctor and the surgery is performed. Visu soon realises that Krishnaveny is paralysed as she was operated on the wrong side of her brain due to a mix-up with another patient. He appeals aggressively to the doctors and has the error corrected by another surgery, then spearheads an angry fight for compensation. The hospital compensates US$2 million to avoid a court case. Due to these actions, Madhu soon falls in love with Visu.

Krishnaveny soon realises that Madhu and Visu are in love and extends the family's stay in the US. However, Nachiappan objects to the romance as he wants his sons to marry identical twin girls. In a flashback, it is shown that Nachiappan had an identical twin brother Pechiappan, who lives in Karaikudi and is a simpleton. They both married for love in their youth, but Pechiappan's wife Sundarambal tortured and abused Nachiappan's pregnant wife Meiyaththa so badly that the latter died after giving birth to Visu and Ramu. Nachiappan eventually left the house along with Visu and Ramu to prevent Pechiappan and Sundarambal from separating over Meiyaththa's death.

Krishnaveny decides to solve the problem by lying to Nachiappan that Madhu does have an identical twin named Vaishnavi, who was raised separately in an orthodox Brahmin household. The reason for their separation is claimed that "having twins would bring bad luck on their family". Nachiappan falls for the lie and leaves for India along with Visu, Ramu, Juno, Krishnaveny, Madhu and Madhesh in order to "meet" Vaishnavi and fix the marriages of Visu and Ramu with Madhu and Vaishnavi respectively. Krishnaveny has Madhu pose as Vaishnavi, who contrary to Madhu, is very demure and traditional in nature. Ramu immediately falls in love with Vaishnavi, unaware that she is Madhu. Meanwhile, Pechiappan, whose marriage with Sundarambal has worsened due to the latter's inability to have children, attempts suicide. Nachiappan rescues him and hatches a plan to unite both the families through Visu's and Ramu's marriage plan. Nachiappan impersonates Pechiappan and leaves for Karaikudi, where with his business sense and practical nature, he rescues Pechiappan's failing restaurant business and eventually reforms Sundarambal as well. Pechiappan takes Nachiappan's place and stays with Visu and Ramu.

Eventually, Madhu, realising that Ramu is madly in love with her alter-ego, decides to stop acting as Vaishnavi as she feels she is hurting Ramu's as well as Visu's feelings through her act. Visu too finds out in parallel that Vaishnavi does not exist. Enraged, Visu and his family immediately leave Madhu's house, but Ramu tells him that Madhu had lied due to her love for him and convinces him to reconcile with her. Ramu further manages to convince his father, unaware that he is his uncle Pechiappan, to get Visu and Madhu married. When Nachiappan realises the truth and finds out that Visu and Madhu are getting married, he immediately rushes to Chennai with Sundarambal and stops the wedding. At this point, it is revealed that both Nachiappan and Pechiappan had impersonated each other in order to reunite both the families. Sundarambal manages to convince Nachiappan to get Visu and Madhu married since Madhu, by posing as Vaishnavi, had done the same thing that Nachiappan and Pechiappan did. Visu and Madhu get married. Later, at their reception, Madhesh entertains the couple and guests with computer-generated special effects.

Cast 

 Prashanth as Viswanathan "Visu" and Ramamoorthy "Ramu" (dual role)
 Aishwarya Rai as Madhumitha "Madhu" and Vaishnavi (Madhu's fake twin) (Voice dubbed by Savitha Reddy)
 Nassar as Nachiappan and Pechiappan (dual role)
 Lakshmi as Krishnaveny
 Raju Sundaram as Madhesh
 Raadhika as Sundarambal
 Senthil as Juno
 S. V. Shekhar as Vellaiappan
 Janaki Sabesh as Durga, Madhumitha's mother
 Geetha as Meiyaththa 
 S. N. Lakshmi as Meiyaththa's mother
 Ganthimathi as Visalakshi

Production

Development 

Made on a record budget of ₹19 crore (worth ₹185 crore in 2021 prices), the film was completed in a year and a half. Jeans, unlike Shankar's other films, was the first to be shot outside of India for major portions of the film. The producers of the film were Ashok Amritraj, Michael Soloman and Murali Manohar, whom all made their Tamil film debuts with Jeans. Amritraj did not work on any Tamil film afterwards. The film reunited Shankar with his award-winning technical crew from his previous film Indian, whilst the cast was finalised by him after he had completed the story.

A difference of opinion exists regarding how the film got its name. According to Amritraj, the title Jeans was selected due to being a homophone of "genes", and "seem[ed] very appropriate to the movie". However, the magazine Rashtriya Sahara stated that Genes was the film's initial title considered by Shankar because the film had Prashanth and Nasser playing dual roles each, adding, "birth of twins is governed by the behaviour of genes".

The film's launch was held at the AVM Studios in Vadapalani, Chennai in December 1996. The Jeans invitation was printed, wrapped in denim and hand-delivered by Shankar to his close colleagues and friends in Chennai, which included prominent actors in the Tamil filmdom. The cast and crew of the film wore their favourite pair of blue jeans to the launch, as requested by the film's producers.

Casting 
The original actor considered for the dual roles of Vishwanathan and Ramamoorthy was Abbas, who rejected the project citing that his dates were booked for the full year of 1997. The second choice for the lead role, Ajith Kumar, also opted out due to call sheet problems. The role eventually went to Prashanth, who sacrificed seven films in the process, and chose to work exclusively on the project during the period. Aishwarya Rai, Miss World 1994, was the original choice for the roles of Madhumitha and Vaishnavi and collaborated with Shankar after she had been unable to work with him in his previous venture Indian. Rai initially attempted to dub in her own voice, but was later dubbed over by Savitha Reddy. The supporting cast included Senthil and Raju Sundaram, with the latter making his debut as an actor. Prominent supporting actresses Lakshmi and Geetha were signed up for the film, whilst Radhika agreed to appear in a guest appearance. Another supporting role was taken by S. Ve. Sekhar after playback singer S. P. Balasubrahmanyam opted out of the role. Shankar wanted Goundamani to appear in a dual role, but due to the actor's unavailability, the genre of the film was changed from comedy to romance; the roles offered to Goundamani went to Nassar.

The other substitution in the project involved the cinematographer. Despite reports that Shankar would again sign-on Jeeva, whom he had worked within Kadhalan, Gentleman and Indian, Santhosh Sivan was announced as the cinematographer for the film. Though between the time of the announcement and the finishing stages of the film, cinematographer Ashok Kumar was publicised as the official cinematographer for the film. In mid-1997, film organisation FEFSI struck and in the midst of this, the film's art director Thotta Tharani, a FEFSI supporter, refused to sacrifice his position in FEFSI and stopped working in Jeans. Without much choice, Shankar signed a newcomer Bala to take over the set design and artwork for the film. The film's art direction is credited with both Thotta Tharani and Bala. S. T. Venky was signed up to deal with the special effects in the film, with Jeans. The film also was assisted in graphics effects created by Pentafour Software.

Filming 

For the scenes set in the United States, the team toured various American cities with a tour party of 35 technicians, including eight from Hollywood. The initial scenes of the Nachiyappan family's catering company were filmed in Las Vegas, whilst other scenes were shot in California at the Universal Studios, where the shooting of foreign films is usually not permitted. However, with influence from the film's producer Ashok Amritraj they were able to obtain special permission to film a few scenes inside. Besides the King Kong set, Jeans was also shot in the "simulated earthquake experience" sets. The filming in Los Angeles received much publicity as well as the filming at the Grand Canyon in Arizona. Other Jeans shooting locations in the United States of America included the Valley of Fire, Manhattan Beach, Malibu Lake and many scenic spots throughout California. The song Columbus was picturised as it at the shores of Venice Beach, California with some foreign male and female dancers. Shankar also filmed in New Jersey and New York City at the World Trade Center when co-producer Michael Salomon and his wife, Luciana Paluzzi visited the sets of Jeans.

After a 45-day schedule in the United States, Shankar and the team returned to India to film a couple of scenes in the climax. The team then visited several other countries to picturise the song Poovukkul, with featured scenes with seven prominent buildings in the world, dubbing Aishwarya Rai as the "eighth wonder of the world". Shankar admitted that due to no real list being present, thought had been put into which wonders were selected. The team made a thirty-day trip around the world stopping to can scenes at the Leaning Tower of Pisa, the Empire State Building, the Great Wall of China, the Taj Mahal, the Egyptian pyramids, the Roman Colosseum and the Eiffel Tower. During the shooting in Paris, Diana, Princess of Wales had died and shooting was delayed as a result of her death. Three weeks prior to the release of the film, on 1 April 1998 a screening was held labelled the Making of Jeans with prominent personalities invited, however, the short film showed the real manufacture of jeans courtesy of a company named Diana Garments. The prank was claimed by a Tamil journal who utilised an April Fools joke.

Soundtrack 

The soundtrack of Jeans was composed by A. R. Rahman, with lyrics by Vairamuthu. The audio launch took place in March 1998. To make the audio cassettes more "elegant and memorable", cassette store owners were told to wrap the cassettes in jeans clothing before giving them to customers.

The soundtrack album features eight songs, with last two being featured in the cassettes only. To make the audio cassettes more "elegant and memorable", cassette store owners were told to wrap the cassettes in jeans clothing before giving them to customers. 

Behindwoods stated that "Jeans is one of AR Rahman’s best selling albums, with every single song topping the charts. From western genres to Carnatic music to songs with East Asian & Egyptian influences, Rahman captured the international theme of Jeans, and, along with Vairamuthu, the duo created music history."

Release 

Jeans was released worldwide on 24 April 1998. With 240 prints, the films holds the 1998 record for a Tamil film. The team also released 35 prints of the film in Malaysia, a record at the time. The film completed 100 days of screening in the theatres in the state of Tamil Nadu, and the Tamil versions was commercially successful. Shankar later revealed that the film's box office performance improved with time. At the Mumbai box office, it performed poorly. The film performed well in Malaysia, running for over 100 days in cinemas. The film was later dubbed and released in Telugu and Hindi under the same title.

Critical reception 
Jeans received widespread critical acclaim, especially for the performance of Prashanth, Nassar, and Lakshmi.
Rajitha, a reviewer from Rediff, praised the characters of Prashanth, Aishwarya Rai and Nassar as "ever dependable", whilst singling out praise for Radhika whom she describes that " with her startling cameo, sweeps the acting honours". The reviewer praised the technical crew describing Venky's FX as a "virtual reality", Ashok Kumar's cinematography as "throughout and outstanding", Raju Sundaram's choreography as "memorable" and A. R. Rahman's score as "entirely hummable". Shankar's directorial attributes were described to be to a "perfect flow of narrative and a penchant for demanding and getting perfection out of every element of his cast and crew" and that the film was an "easy fit". The Indian Express called the film a "hilarious comedy" and drew significant praise to the performance of Aishwarya Rai and the music of Rahman. Indolink rated the film 3.5 stars and said, "Jeans is a great family entertainer with no violence or intimate scenes. But do bear in mind that the movie is almost 3 hours long (not that you feel the length). But do ensure that you watch it in a cinema with "dts" facility." In contrast, Deccan Herald described the film as a "colossal waste", criticising Shankar's story and direction and the performances of Prashanth and Lakshmi.

Accolades 
Jeans was nominated by India as its entry for the Best Foreign Language Film for the Academy Awards in 1998, but did not make the final shortlist. The decision to submit the film met with heavy ridicule as it was seen as a "populist popcorn entertainer". Sudhir Srinivasan, writing for The Hindu Thread in 2016, also disliked the decision to submit Jeans. The film won four Tamil Nadu State Film Awards: Best Comedian (Senthil), Best Female Playback Singer (Nithyasree Mahadevan), Best Choreographer (Raju Sundaram) and Best Costume Designer (Kasi). It also won a Filmfare Award for Best Music for A. R. Rahman, and the National Film Award for Best Special Effects.

Possible sequel 
In November 2013, Prashanth announced that he had registered the title Jeans 2 and was completing the pre-production works of a sequel to the 1998 film. The film was set to be directed and produced by Prashanth's father Thiagarajan, who revealed that production would begin in May 2014 and that they were trying to bring members of the original team back for the venture. In January 2014, Ashok Amritraj stated that he was not involved in the sequel and questioned the viability of the project, citing that he did not believe that Prashanth and his father had the rights to make a sequel. In February 2016, Prashanth reaffirmed that the sequel was in development.

See also 
 List of submissions to the 71st Academy Awards for Best Foreign Language Film
 List of Indian submissions for the Academy Award for Best Foreign Language Film

References

External links 
 
 
 

1998 films
1998 romantic comedy films
Twins in Indian films
Films set in Los Angeles
1990s Tamil-language films
Films scored by A. R. Rahman
Films directed by S. Shankar
Indian romantic comedy films
Films about Indian Americans
Films shot in Agra
Films shot in Egypt
Films about brothers
Films about Indian weddings
Indian pregnancy films
Indian nonlinear narrative films
Films about marriage
Films that won the Best Special Effects National Film Award
Indian films set in New York City